Gothenburg Museum of Art is located at Götaplatsen in Gothenburg, Sweden.
 It claims to be the third largest art museum in Sweden by size of its collection.

Collections

The museum holds the world's finest collection of late 19th century Nordic art. A highlight is the lavishly decorated Fürstenberg Gallery, named after a leading Gothenburg art donor, Pontus Fürstenberg and his wife Göthilda. Among the artists showcased are P.S. Krøyer, Carl Larsson, Bruno Liljefors, Edvard Munch, and Anders Zorn.

The museum also houses older and contemporary art, both Nordic and international. The collection includes, for example, Monet, Picasso and Rembrandt. The Museum has been awarded three stars in the Michelin Green Guide (Green Guide Scandinavia).

Architecture
The museum building was designed for the Gothenburg Exhibition (Jubileumsutställningen i Göteborg) in 1923 by architect Sigfrid Ericson (1879-1958). The eastern extension was added 1966–1968, after drawings by Rune Falk (1926-2007).
The museum was originally built in celebration of the city's 300th anniversary, and represents the monumental Neo-Classical style in Nordic architecture. It is built of a yellow brick called ”Gothenburg brick” because of the material's frequent use in the city. The museums forms the imposing end of the main street of the city, Kungsportsavenyn.

History 
The museum has its roots in the Museum of Gothenburg, founded in 1861. In 1923, as part of the construction of Götaplatsen as a cultural center, the museum's building was built. In 1925, the museum was inaugurated. It was expanded in 1968 and 1996.

Gallery

See also
Hasselblad Foundation

References

External links

Art museums and galleries in Sweden
Art
Art museums established in 1923
1923 establishments in Sweden
Terminating vistas
World's fair architecture in Sweden
Museum of Art